The Hyde County Regiment was a unit of the North Carolina militia that served during the American Revolution.  Hyde County, formed in 1705, had a militia in colonial times that was used to defend the coast of the Province of North Carolina.  The North Carolina General Assembly authorized the Hyde County Regiment on September 9, 1775, along with 34 other county regiments. The officers were appointed and commissioned by the Governor of North Carolina.  The regiment was subordinated to the New Bern District Brigade of North Carolina militia on May 4, 1776. The regiment was disbanded at the end of the war.

Officers
The following listings show the known commanders, officers, staff, and soldiers of the Wayne County regiment
 Colonel Rotheas Latham (1775–1779)
 Colonel Abraham Jones (1779–1783)
 Colonel William Russell (1779–1780)
 Colonel Burridge Hutchins Selby (1780–1783)

Rotheas Latham was born in East Bridgewater, Massachusetts in 1725.  His parents were Thomas Latham and Deborah Hardin.  He was a descendant of Pilgrim James Chilton.  His family moved to Hyde County, North Carolina before 1750, where he was a prominent landowner and active in business and political affairs.  He owned a mill and was appointed by Governor Arthur Dobbs to serve as justice of the peace in Hyde County.  In 1773, he represented Hyde County in the North Carolina General Assembly in New Bern. On August 25, 1774, he again represented Hyde County in the Provincial Congress in New Bern.  He represented Hyde County in the Provincial Congress of August 1775 in Hillsboro.  He was appointed a colonel in the Hyde County Minutemen in 1775 and was also colonel of the unit when it became the Hyde County Regiment in September 1775.  He again represented Hyde County in the Provincial Congress of April 1776 in Halifax.  He was member of the North Carolina House of Commons in 1780 and 1781.  He died in 1784 in Hyde County.

William Russel served in the senate of the North Carolina Legislature from 1777 to 1783.

Known engagements
The Hyde County Regiment was involved in two known engagements: skirmish on Cape Hatteras on June 27, 1779 and the Battle of Guilford Court House on March 15, 1781.

References

 Hyde County History, A Hyde County Bicentennial Project, 1976; Hyde County Historical Society; pp. 122–123. "The Swan Quarter Bicentennial Committee, with the assistance of the Hyde County Historical Society, compiled the following roster of individuals who participated in the Revolutionary War. The individuals on this list were verified as Hyde County residents by one or more of the following sources: Roster of Soldiers From North Carolina in the American Revolution; Some Colonial and Revolutionary Families of North Carolina, Vol. 1; Index to Hathaway's Register; "Hyde County Census 1786, 1790, 1800”; "Hyde County 1700 Wills and Deeds”; "1800 Wills”; "Marriage Bonds”; Bible Records."
 Hyde County History, A Hyde County Bicentennial Project, 1976; Hyde County Historical Society; pp. 123–125. "The following list of Soldiers in the Continental Line has been abstracted from the Roster of Soldiers From North Carolina in the American Revolution. These men were not designated as Hyde County, but were either Newbern Militia District or appeared without a District designation. Supportive data from Hyde County Court Records, Federal Census Records, Index to Hathaway's Register, and Estate Papers (State Department of Archives and History) strongly indicates these men were residents of Hyde County. However, we present this data hoping anyone having information to confirm or disprove these findings will share such with us."
 "High Tides", Vol. 2, No. 1, Spring 1981; Hyde County Historical Society; p. 20. September 3, 1778, Halifax, NC; List of volunteers in the Continental Army, for nine months service.
 "High Tides", Vol. 2, No. 1, Spring 1981; Hyde County Historical Society; pp. 21–22. Hyde County Veterans of the American Revolution.
 NC Department of Archives and History; February 7, 1782, A list of Invalids above and below the age of fifty years.

See also
 Southern Campaigns: Pension Transactions for a description of the transcription effort by Will Graves
 Southern theater of the American Revolutionary War
 North Carolina State Navy
 List of North Carolina militia units in the American Revolution

North Carolina militia
1775 establishments in North Carolina